Kerry County Museum is a museum located in Tralee, County Kerry in Ireland. The museum is based in the Ashe Memorial Hall in the centre of Tralee. The aim of the museum is to collect, record, preserve and display the material heritage of County Kerry.

History
Before the First World War, Kerry County Council had been based in a purpose-built building on Godfrey Place; however the building had been set on fire by British special constables during the Siege of Tralee of November 1920. A new building, which was dedicated to the memory of the republican Thomas Ashe opened as offices for Kerry County Council in 1928. After the county council moved to County Hall, the building fell empty in January 1989. Kerry County Museum was established in the early 1990s as an initiative of Tralee Urban District Council to exhibit the material heritage of County Kerry. In the early years the museum focused on exhibited Kerry's archaeological treasures as part of its "medieval experience".

Exhibits
Exhibits include an early medieval brooch and duelling pistols used by Daniel O'Connell in the early nineteenth century.

References

External links
Official website

1992 establishments in Ireland
Buildings and structures in Tralee
History of County Kerry
Museums established in 1992
Local museums in the Republic of Ireland
Museums in County Kerry